William Martin Gulager (November 16, 1928 – August 5, 2022), better known as Clu Gulager, was an American television and film actor and director born in Holdenville, Oklahoma. He first became known for his work in television, appearing in the co-starring role of William H. Bonney (Billy the Kid) in the 1960–1962 NBC television series The Tall Man and as Emmett Ryker in another NBC Western series, The Virginian. He later had a second career as a horror film actor, including a lead part in Dan O'Bannon's The Return of the Living Dead (1985). He also was in A Nightmare on Elm Street 2: Freddy's Revenge (1985). In 2005 he started acting in his son's horror films — the Feasts films and Piranha 3DD — in his 80s.

Gulager's first major film role was in Don Siegel's The Killers (1964) with Lee Marvin and Ronald Reagan in his only movie role as a villain, followed by a supporting part in the racing film Winning (1969) opposite Paul Newman and Joanne Woodward; in Peter Bogdanovich's drama The Last Picture Show (1971); and opposite John Wayne in McQ (1974). In the 1980s, Gulager appeared in several horror films, such as The Initiation (1984) and the zombie comedy The Return of the Living Dead (1985). In 2005, he appeared in the horror film Feast, as well as its sequels. He also appeared in the independent film Tangerine (2015) and in Quentin Tarantino's Once Upon a Time in Hollywood (2019), which was his final film role.

Gulager directed the short film A Day with the Boys, which was nominated for the Palme d'Or for Best Short Film at the 1969 Cannes Film Festival.

Early life
Gulager was born in Holdenville, Oklahoma, on November 16, 1928, the son of John Delancy Gulager, who had been an actor before settling down to practice law in nearby Muskogee. His paternal grandmother, Martha Schrimsher Gulager, was a sister of Mary Schrimsher, the mother of Will Rogers, making Gulager and Rogers first cousins, once removed. He was Cherokee, having been an enrolled citizen of the Cherokee Nation of Oklahoma.

His Cherokee nickname was given to him by his father for the clu-clu birds (known in English as martins, like his middle name) that were nesting at the Gulager home at the time of his birth. From 1946 to 1948, Gulager served in the United States Marine Corps at Camp Pendleton. After attending Northeastern State University in Tahlequah, Oklahoma, Gulager transferred to the Baptist-affiliated Baylor University in Waco, Texas, where he graduated. He won a one-year scholarship to study abroad in Paris, where he worked under Jean-Louis Barrault, a French actor and director. In 1952, he returned to Baylor. On June 19, 1952, he married fellow actor Miriam Byrd-Nethery. The couple had two sons, John and Tom, and remained married until her death in 2003.

Career

In 1958 he appeared as Roy Carter in the episode "The Return of Roy Carter" (written by Gene Roddenberry, creator of Star Trek) in the Western television series Have Gun – Will Travel starring Richard Boone.

Gulager stated, "Lew Wasserman saw me on a Playhouse 90 episode where I played an Elvis Presley-type character. I became the first contract player at Universal". In the spring of 1959, he signed with MCA-TV, where he appeared as Tommy Pavlock in the episode "The Immigrant" of NBC's series The Lawless Years, a 1920s crime drama. In the fall of 1959, he appeared in the episode "The Temple of the Swinging Doll" of NBC's short-lived espionage drama Five Fingers, starring David Hedison.

On June 3, 1959, he guest-starred as the unscrupulous photographer Elliott Garrison in "The Andrew Hale Story" on NBC's Wagon Train. On October 11, 1959, Gulager appeared as a U.S. Navy sailor in the "Appointment at Eleven" episode of Alfred Hitchcock Presents and again as an escaped convict in "Pen Pal" on November 1, 1960. On The Untouchables, he played the role of real-life vicious mob killer Vincent "Mad Dog" Coll. Gulager was hailed for his utterly chilling performance as the psychopathic Coll. Late in 1959, he was cast as Beau Chandler in the episode "Jessie Quinn" of the NBC Western series Riverboat, starring Darren McGavin and Burt Reynolds. The episode is a tale of intrigue involving the Texas Revolution. Capt. Holden attempts to send weapons to Sam Houston, but forces of Antonio López de Santa Anna in Mexico threaten to blow up Holden's vessel, the Enterprise.

From 1960 to 1962, Gulager played Billy the Kid in The Tall Man, opposite Barry Sullivan as Sheriff Pat Garrett. The episodes portray Billy as a sympathetic character without resorting to the "misunderstood young man" theme used in such films as The Outlaw (1943) and The Left Handed Gun (1958). In 1961, Gulager guest-starred in another NBC Western, Whispering Smith, Audie Murphy's only attempt at series television. Gulager portrayed Deputy Sheriff Emmett Ryker from 1964 to 1968 on The Virginian, the 90-minute Western series in which he starred with James Drury, Doug McClure, Lee J. Cobb, Roberta Shore, Randy Boone, Gary Clarke, and Diane Roter. Gulager appeared more than 60 times in other roles in film and television, including the film Winning (1969) and the CBS series Three for the Road. He also appeared several times on NBC's Bonanza. He starred with Lee Marvin, Ronald Reagan, John Cassavetes, and Angie Dickinson in The Killers (1964), teaming with Marvin as a pair of ruthless hit men. The Killers was intended to be one of the early made-for-TV movies as part of a Project 120 series of films that did not reach the airwaves, but NBC cited it too violent for broadcast; Universal released the film theatrically instead.

In 1971, Gulager appeared in Peter Bogdanovich's The Last Picture Show. In 1977, long after his role on The Virginian, he appeared in Rod Taylor's unsuccessful NBC Western series, The Oregon Trail, in the episode "The Army Deserter". Gulager also played the boss of Susan Sarandon in a 1977 film drama, The Other Side of Midnight. In 1981, he co-starred as Angela Channing's long-suffering nephew Chase Gioberti, opposite Oscar Award-winner Jane Wyman, Lorenzo Lamas, William R. Moses, and Jamie Rose, in the pilot episode of The Vintage Years, which was later retooled as the primetime soap opera Falcon Crest. When he was not rehired to continue with his role, Robert Foxworth took over the role until his firing in 1987.

In 1985, he was cast as Burt Wilson in Dan O'Bannon's The Return of the Living Dead. He was also a featured player in director John Landis' darkly comedic 1985 film noir satire, Into the Night, a film rife with insider Hollywood cameos, as an FBI agent who is a courier of a cache of clandestine funds, which he grudgingly delivers to secure the safety of the film's two romantic leads (Michelle Pfeiffer and Jeff Goldblum).

In 2005, Gulager appeared as a shotgun-toting bartender in Feast, followed by the film's two sequels, Feast II: Sloppy Seconds (2008), and Feast III: The Happy Finish (2009), all of which were directed by his son, John. He also had a minor role in the critically acclaimed independent film Tangerine (2015). He had a role in the 2012 film Piranha 3DD. Gulager's final screen performance was as an unnamed book store owner in Quentin Tarantino's Once Upon a Time in Hollywood in 2019.

Death
Gulager died of natural causes at the Los Angeles home of his son John on August 5, 2022. He was 93.

Filmography

Film

Television

Awards and nominations
 The Virginian (TV series) (1966) Bronze Wrangler Award for Best Fictional Television Drama ensemble cast
 A Day with the Boys (1969) (director, short film) Nominated Palme d'Or — Cannes Film Festival "Best Short Film"
 Hunter's Blood (1986) Nominated Saturn Award "Best Supporting Actor" 
 Gulager is one of several "Oklahoma Walk of Fame" members represented on medallions in front of Tulsa's Circle Cinema.

References

External links
 
 
 Interview from psychotronicvideo.com
 Encyclopedia of Oklahoma History and Culture – Gulager, Clu

1928 births
2022 deaths
People from Holdenville, Oklahoma
Military personnel from Oklahoma
American male film actors
American male television actors
Cherokee Nation artists
Male actors from Oklahoma
United States Marines
Male actors from Los Angeles
Western (genre) television actors
20th-century Native Americans
21st-century Native Americans
American male musical theatre actors